Halloween 77 is a live album by Frank Zappa, released in October 2017, consisting of six recordings of shows performed in late October 1977 at the Palladium in New York City. It was released as a USB containing 24-bit WAV audio and as a 3-CD box set. The release contains a total of 158 tracks.

Personnel 
Musicians

 Frank Zappa (guitar, vocals)
 Adrian Belew (guitar, vocals)
 Terry Bozzio (drums, vocals)
 Roy Estrada (gas mask, vocals)
 Phil Kaufman ("human trombone")
 Ed Mann (percussion)
 Tommy Mars (keyboards, vocals)
 Thomas Nordegg ("some magic tricks")
 Patrick O'Hearn (bass)
 Peter Wolf (keyboards)

References 

Frank Zappa live albums
Live albums published posthumously

2017 live albums